This is a list of sports people who have played both cricket and rugby union at a high level. First-class or List A cricket, provincial rugby and international cricket or rugby are considered to be high level for the purposes of this list. To be eligible, players must have appeared for their country's national side in at least one of the sports. The lists below are alphabetical and sorted by the country in which the player spent their international career.

Alfred Shaw and Arthur Shrewsbury, who organised the first British Isles rugby tour to Australasia in 1888 were also noted cricketers.

While the Wales national rugby union team is a force in international rugby, the Wales national cricket team plays only rarely, and the nation of Wales is usually subsumed under England for cricketing purposes.

Both Irish rugby players and cricketers, unlike soccer players, also play as one nation.

The two sports have also had a considerable overlap in commentators and journalists, e.g. Robert Hudson, Howard Marshall, Lisa Olson, Denzil Batchelor, Ian Smith, Steve James, Allan Massie

Many venues, including St. Helen's Rugby and Cricket Ground, Carisbrook, Eden Park, Raeburn Place, Headingley Stadium, Sydney Cricket Ground, McLean Park, The Oval, Cardiff Arms Park and Limavady Cricket and Rugby Club have been used for both rugby and cricket over the years.

Due to the historical relationship between rugby league and rugby union, several of these players have also competed in high level rugby league as well. (See List of cricket and rugby league players)

Dual internationals

Australia

England

Fiji

Ireland

New Zealand

Scotland

South Africa

Zimbabwe (former Rhodesia)

Two nations

Other nations

International cricket – Domestic rugby

England

Ireland

New Zealand

South Africa

Domestic cricket – International rugby

Australia

England

Ireland

New Zealand

Scotland

South Africa

Wales

See also
 Douglas Bader, amputee WWII flying ace, whose rugby and cricket careers were cut short by an accident in 1931.
 Ted Bateson, rugby union (Yorkshire, and Skipton), rugby league (Wakefield Trinity), and association football (soccer) (Blackburn Rovers) footballer, and cricketer (Lancashire)
 Angus Buchanan, who scored the first try in international rugby and who was also a cricketer.
 Sydney Deane, notable cricketer and rugby player, and first Australian in a Hollywood film.
 John Graham, former All-Black and New Zealand cricket team manager from 1997 to 1999.
 List of cricket and rugby league players
 List of players who have converted from one football code to another

References

Sources
 Bath, Richard (ed.) The Scotland Rugby Miscellany (Vision Sports Publishing Ltd, 2007 )
 Godwin, Terry Complete Who's Who of International Rugby (Cassell, 1987)

External links
Cricinfo: Rugger Buggers

Rugby union players
Lists of rugby union players